Nedyurevo is a rural locality (a village) in Kiprevskoye Rural Settlement, Kirzhachsky District, Vladimir Oblast, Russia. The population was 10 as of 2010. There are 7 streets.

Geography 
Nedyurevo is located on the Bolshoy Kirzhach River, 23 km northeast of Kirzhach (the district's administrative centre) by road. Zherdeyevo is the nearest rural locality.

References 

Rural localities in Kirzhachsky District